Systata angustata is a species of ulidiid or picture-winged fly in the genus Systata of the family Tephritidae.

References

Ulidiidae